Last Call is a 1958 Australian TV play set in a South American country. It was directed by Christopher Muir.

Plot
General Zaguerro is the President of a fictitious South African republic. He has to decide whether to lead his army against the enemy or stay at his headquarters and defend his niece's honour.

Cast
John Morgan		
Richard Pratt		
Wynn Roberts
Judith Thompson

Production
It was broadcast in a series of "live" dramas that were shown every fortnight on Sunday night on ABV-2 Melbourne. In order, they were The Governess, The Last Call, The Rose without a Thorn, The Lark, Citizen of Westminster, and Enemy of the People (the last of "the season").

Some outdoor scenes were shot at Moorabbin Airport.

Judith Thompson later appeared in another South American set drama, You Can't Win 'Em All.

See also
List of live television plays broadcast on Australian Broadcasting Corporation (1950s)

References

External links

1950s Australian television plays
1958 television plays